The lateral cricoarytenoid (also anterior cricoarytenoid) muscles extend from the lateral cricoid cartilage to the muscular process of the arytenoid cartilage. By rotating the arytenoid cartilages medially, these muscles adduct the vocal cords and thereby close the rima glottidis, protecting the airway. (Their action is antagonistic to that of the posterior cricoarytenoid muscles.) The lateral cricoarytenoid muscles receive innervation from the recurrent laryngeal branch of the vagus nerve (CN X).

Additional images

See also
 Cricoid cartilage
 Arytenoid cartilage

External links
 
 

Muscles of the head and neck